Danièl "Daan" Marinus Johannes Kagchelland (25 March 1914 Rotterdam – 24 December 1998, The Hague) was a sailor from the Netherlands, who represented his country at the 1936 Summer Olympics in Berlin, Germany. There Kagchelland won the gold medal in the O-Jolle.

Sources

 
 

1914 births
1998 deaths
Sportspeople from Rotterdam
Dutch male sailors (sport)
Sailors at the 1936 Summer Olympics – O-Jolle
Olympic sailors of the Netherlands
Medalists at the 1936 Summer Olympics
Olympic medalists in sailing
Olympic gold medalists for the Netherlands